Welford is a national park in Central West Queensland, Australia, 991 km west of Brisbane. It is located 30km to the South-east of Jundah. The park was established in 1994 to protect the biodiversity of the Mulga Lands, Mitchell Grass Downs and Channel Country bioregions. The southern border is marked by the Barcoo River. 

The name of the park comes from the original owner of the grazing station, Richard Welford, which was eventually called Welford Downs after his death. Welford himself had named the station Walton.

The rare yellow-footed rock-wallaby is found in the park as are aboriginal stone arrangements and water wells.  Welford Homestead is heritage-listed homestead built in the early 1880s.

Camping with a permit is allowed at one site along the Barcoo River.

Recreational activities are centered on the permanent waterholes along the Barcoo where visitors can enjoy fishing, canoeing and kayaking. There are also three tourist drives that cover the river, sand dune and mulga escarpment ecosystems found in the park and totalling more than 100 kilometres.

See also

 Protected areas of Queensland
Lochern National Park
Idalia National Park

References

National parks of Queensland
Protected areas established in 1992
Central West Queensland
1992 establishments in Australia